Lê Văn Hưng (born 12 December 1987) is a Vietnamese footballer who plays as a goalkeeper for V-League club SHB Đà Nẵng.

Personal life
Văn Hưng was born to a wealthy family in Mang Thít District. His father, a policeman, died when he was four. He and his two sisters were raised by his mom, an algae farmer.

For a while Văn Hưng was dating Vietnamese model Helen Pham and where the subject of much media attention. The couple broke up however in 2014 after his move to Da Nang.

References 

1987 births
Living people
Vietnamese footballers
Association football goalkeepers
V.League 1 players
Song Lam Nghe An FC players
SHB Da Nang FC players
People from Vĩnh Long province